Kim Min-soo (born January 22, 1975) is a South Korean former judoka, professional mixed martial artist and K-1 kickboxer. He is best known for becoming a K-1 World Grand Prix 2006 in Seoul finalist and also winning earning a Silver Medal in Judo at the 1996 Summer Olympics in Atlanta. He is also known for his fights with WWE professional wrestler and UFC heavyweight champion Brock Lesnar, WWE wrestler and K-1 fighter Sean O'Haire, and NFL player turned kickboxer and New Japan Pro-Wrestling contender Bob Sapp. Min-soo holds a notable kickboxing win over Muay Thai world champion Mourad Bouzidi. He announced his retirement from contact sports in 2011, with subsequent stints as color commentator for Japanese and Korean mixed martial arts and professional wrestling events. Kim is also the head judo coach for the Korean Top Team.

Career

Judo
By the time he was 19, Kim was competing internationally in major judo tournaments - winning the gold medal at the 1994 World Junior Championships in Cairo by defeating Istvan Szasz in the -95 kilogram division. He entered the 1996 Summer Olympics as a half-heavyweight member of the South Korean national team, in which capacity he reached the finals and earned the silver medal by defeating Stéphane Traineau but losing to Pawel Nastula. He remained active in the sport for another seven years, medaling in at least five international tournaments and three world cup events.

Kim's career includes wins over Keith Morgan, Detlef Knorrek, Vernharð Þorleifsson, Dmitri Sergeyev, Ben Sonnemans, and Nicolas Gill.

Mixed martial arts
Kim made his mixed martial arts debut at the Hero's 1 event on March 26, 2005, against kickboxer and mixed martial artist Bob Sapp. Despite a promising start wherein Kim negated Sapp's charging attacks and dealt him a facial laceration that necessitated a medical time-out, Sapp struck Kim in the face immediately after the match resumed and knocked him out. At Hero's 2 in the following July, Kim met kickboxer Ray Sefo in a longer but ultimately similar fight wherein Sefo first stunned Kim with strikes before finishing him with a kick to the head.

Kim's subsequent bout in the following November against pro wrestler Sean O'Haire and seasoned fighter Yoshihisa Yamamoto in March 2006 proved more fruitful, allowing Kim to utilize his grappling expertise and defeat both opponents by submission. This was followed by a string of losses against increasingly imposing opponents over the following 15 months. Semmy Schilt escaped Kim's forearm choke and trapped him in a guard before punching him into submission. Don Frye and Mighty Mo knocked him out with strikes. In arguably Kim's most famous match, he replaced Choi Hong-man on short notice to face pro wrestler Brock Lesnar in the latter's debut fight, wherein he submitted to Lesnar's punches after being taken down.

At Hero's 2007 in Korea in October, Kim secured the third victory of his MMA career in an openweight bout against Ikuhisa Minowa, winning by technical knockout with a series of punches. His final fight took place about two years later on November 27, 2009, at The Khan 2, where he was knocked out by former sumo wrestler Sentoryū Henri. His record stands at 3 wins and 7 losses.

Kickboxing
Kim made his kickboxing debut on March 3, 2006, at the K-1 World Grand Prix 2006 in Seoul tournament. In his quarterfinal match, he met South Korean sumo wrestler Kim Kyoung-Suk. The bout was unorthodox, with both fighters employing spins and jumping kicks and the much larger Kyoung-Suk chasing Min-soo across the ring. At one point, the judoka slipped while attempting a kick and the rikishi made as though to stomp him, resulting in a point deduction for unsportsmanlike conduct. The penalty gave Min-soo the advantage and he earned a unanimous decision victory.

In the following round, Kim met seasoned Muay Thai champion Mourad Bouzidi. Despite Bouzidi's superior technique and powerful low kicks, Kim displayed greater aggression and upper body strength, resulting in both fighters scoring a knockdown apiece and meeting after the initial three rounds for an additional three minutes. After enduring a low blow, Kim finished strongly and was able to move on to the finals against Yusuke Fujimoto. The Japanese karateka struck with low kicks, working on Kim's already-battered legs until he limped. Eventually, Kim fell to Fujimoto's punching combinations in the second round for a knockout loss.

Kim fought twice more for K-1, ending his kickboxing career with a 4–1 record following a win over American Scott Junk at the K-1 World Grand Prix 2008 in Hawaii on September 8.

Achievements and titles
Kickboxing
K-1 World Grand Prix 2006 in Seoul Runner-up
Judo
2003 Iran FAJR International (100 kg) - Gold medalist
2001 Pacific Rim Judo Championships (+100k g) - Silver medalist
2001 Pacific Rim Judo Championships (-100k g) - Silver medalist
2000 Iran FAJR International (Absolute) - Silver medalist
2000 Iran FAJR International (100 kg) - Bronze medalist
1999 British Open (-100 kg) - Bronze medalist
1998 Matsutaro Shoriki Cup (-100 kg) - Silver medalist
1997 World Masters Championship (-95 kg) - Bronze medalist
1997 ASKO World Championships (-95k g) - Bronze medalist
1997 Tournoi de Paris World Championship (-95 kg) - Bronze medalist
1996 Atlanta Olympics Men's Half Heavyweight Judo - Silver medalist
1996 World Masters Championship (-95 kg) - 7th place
1996 ASKO World Championships (-95 kg) - Bronze medalist
1995 Moscow International Championships (-95 kg) - 5th place
1994 World Junior Championships (-95 kg) - Gold medalist
1994 Torneo Citta di Roma (-95 kg) - Bronze medalist

Mixed martial arts record

|-
| Loss
| align=center| 3–7
| Sentoryu Henri
| KO (punches and knees)
| The Khan 2
| 
| align=center| 1
| align=center| 1:12
| Seoul, South Korea
| 
|-
| Win
| align=center| 3–6
| Ikuhisa Minowa
| TKO (punches)
| Hero's 2007 in Korea
| 
| align=center| 1
| align=center| 3:46
| Seoul, South Korea
| 
|-
| Loss
| align=center| 2–6
| Brock Lesnar
| TKO (submission to punches)
| K-1 Dynamite!! USA
| 
| align=center| 1
| align=center| 1:09
| Los Angeles, California, United States
| 
|-
| Loss
| align=center| 2–5
| Mighty Mo
| KO (punch)
| Hero's 8
| 
| align=center| 1
| align=center| 2:37
| Nagoya, Japan 
| 
|-
| Loss
| align=center| 2–4
| Don Frye
| KO (punch)
| Hero's 7
| 
| align=center| 2
| align=center| 2:47
| Yokohama, Japan
| 
|-
| Loss
| align=center| 2–3
| Semmy Schilt
| Submission (triangle choke)
| Hero's 6
| 
| align=center| 1
| align=center| 4:46
| Tokyo, Japan 
| 
|-
| Win
| align=center| 2–2
| Yoshihisa Yamamoto
| Submission (rear-naked choke)
| Hero's 4
| 
| align=center| 2
| align=center| 1:32
| Tokyo, Japan
| 
|-
| Win
| align=center| 1–2
| Sean O'Haire
| Submission (guillotine choke)
| Hero's 2005 in Seoul
| 
| align=center| 1
| align=center| 4:46
| Seoul, South Korea 
| 
|-
| Loss
| align=center| 0–2
| Ray Sefo 	
| KO (head kick)
| Hero's 2
| 
| align=center| 2
| align=center| 0:30
| Tokyo, Japan 
| 
|-
| Loss
| align=center| 0–1
| Bob Sapp
| KO (punches)
| Hero's 1
| 
| align=center| 1
| align=center| 1:12 
| Saitama, Saitama, Japan
| 
|-

Kickboxing record

Filmography

Television show

References

External links

Min Soo Kim Official K-1 profile

Heavyweight mixed martial artists
Judoka at the 1996 Summer Olympics
Living people
Olympic judoka of South Korea
Olympic medalists in judo
Olympic silver medalists for South Korea
Sportspeople from Seoul
South Korean male judoka
South Korean male kickboxers
South Korean male mixed martial artists
Mixed martial artists utilizing kickboxing
Mixed martial artists utilizing judo
Heavyweight kickboxers
1975 births
World judo champions
Martial arts school founders
Judoka trainers
Medalists at the 1996 Summer Olympics